Boscarne Junction railway station is a railway station on the Bodmin and Wenford Railway in Cornwall, United Kingdom, and is its current terminus of the railway. It is adjacent to the Camel Trail, a long-distance footpath and cycle trail.

History 

Boscarne Junction was created in 1888 when the Great Western Railway built a line to connect from their Bodmin General railway station to the Bodmin and Wadebridge Railway.

Originally there was a loop on either side of the line, each straddling the junction which was controlled by a signal box; a second and longer loop was added from the signal box extending down the Wenfordbridge line well beyond the junction before 1911.

From 15 June 1964 to 18 April 1966 a small halt was built at the junction to enable a separate shuttle service to operate along the Bodmin North branch to connect with trains between Padstow and Bodmin Road.

The line to Wadebridge was truncated at the road just beyond the signal box in 1981, and the line closed completely on 3 October 1983.

Revival

Today the station consists of a platform with enclosed shelter. One of the former signal posts can still be seen in the small grass 'triangle' area just beyond the end of the platform.

Although the end of the line, it has been proposed that an extension to  will be constructed.

Services

References 

Railway stations in Great Britain opened in 1997
Railway stations built for UK heritage railways
Heritage railway stations in Cornwall
Bodmin and Wenford Railway